Ganadoga, originally designated YT-390, was reclassified YTB-390 on 15 May 1944; laid down 2 August 1944 by Consolidated Shipbuilding Corp., Morris Heights, N.Y.; launched 9 September 1944; and placed in service 15 December 1944.

Ganadoga was assigned to 5th Naval District, Norfolk, and performed miscellaneous harbor operations for the next 18 years. She was reclassified YTM-390 on 1 February 1962, and in December of that year she was transferred to the 6th Naval District at Charleston, SC.  In 1980  she was expended as a target in support of fleet exercises.

References
 
 NavSource Online: Service Ship Photo Archive Ganadoga (YTM-390)

Sassaba-class tugs
Ships built in Morris Heights, Bronx
1944 ships
World War II auxiliary ships of the United States